Tom & Jerry Kids is a  Fox Kids animated television series. It was broadcast in four seasons from 1990 to 1993.

Series overview

Episodes 
The segments indicate in colors by which characters starred in them:
 Blue = Tom & Jerry Kids (99 segments)
 Red = Droopy & Dripple (67 segments)
 Sky Blue = Spike & Tyke (16 segments)
 Maroon = Urfo & Buzz (1 segment)
 Green = Wildmouse (2 segments)
 Orange = Slowpoke Antonio (2 segments)
 Purple = Swampy Fox and Gator Brothers (1 segment)
 Light Blue = Bernie Bird (2 segments)
 Tan = Kyle the Cat (1 segment)
 Cyan = Mouse Scouts (1 segment)
 Lime = Blast-Off Buzzard (2 segments)
 Pink = Calaboose Cal (2 segments)

Season 1 (1990)

Season 2 (1991)

Season 3 (1992) 
For this season only (except the first half), it splits into 2 episodes airing on Saturday and Sunday and the episodes itself haves 26 episodes with 78 segments in total, making this to be a longest-running season in history.

Season 4 (1993) 
Some of the episodes were produced in 1992.

See also 
 List of characters in Tom & Jerry Kids
 List of works produced by Hanna-Barbera Productions

References

External links 
 
 The Big Cartoon Database – A complete detailed listing of each Tom & Jerry Kids episode.

Lists of American children's animated television series episodes